The 2009 CONCACAF Gold Cup group stage was played July 3–12, 2009.

Format 

The draw for the Group Stage was announced April 2, 2009. The twelve qualified teams were divided into three groups of four. The top two teams in each group advanced to the knockout stage along with the best two of the third-place teams, filling out the knockout field of eight.

If teams were level on points, they were ranked on the following criteria in order:

 Greater number of points in matches between the tied teams (if applicable)
 Greater goal difference in matches between the tied teams (if more than two teams finish equal on points)
 Greater number of goals scored in matches among the tied teams (if more than two teams finish equal on points)
 Greater goal difference in all group matches
 Greater number of goals scored in all group matches
 If teams are still tied, CONCACAF will hold a drawing of lots

Group A

Group B

Group C

Ranking of third-place teams

References 

Group stage